So Haunt Me is a British television sitcom about a family that moves into a home occupied by the ghost of its previous resident, a middle-aged Jewish mother. The show was created by Paul Mendelson who was also credited on another British sitcom May to December. So Haunt Me was produced by Cinema Verity for the BBC and originally aired from 1992 to 1994.

Peter Rokeby (played by George Costigan) loses his job as advertising copywriter, and resolves to become a freelance writer.  Owing to this change in circumstances, he and his wife Sally (Tessa Peake-Jones) move with their children into a more modest home in Meadow Road, Willesden.  The family soon finds that the ghost of a previous owner, Yetta Feldman (Miriam Karlin), still occupies the residence, and has been scaring occupants away for years.  Yetta is a stereotypical interfering, middle-aged Jewish mother who died suddenly after choking on a chicken bone.  While Sally can both see and speak to their ghost, Peter – much to his frustration – initially cannot.  The family agrees to help Yetta find her grown-up daughter Carole ("Carol-with-an-E").

So Haunt Me aired on BBC1 as 18 half-hour episodes in three series and one special from 1992 to 1994. The Rokeby children David and Tammy were played by Jeremy Green and Laura Howard (credited during the first series as Laura Simmons) respectively. Neighbour Mr Bloom was played by David Graham.

Episodes

Series overview

Series 1 (1992)

Christmas Special (1992)

Series 2 (1993)

Series 3 (1994)

Release

To date, the show hasn't been released on VHS or DVD in the UK, and there currently aren't any plans for a home release.

References

External links
 
 

1990s British sitcoms
1992 British television series debuts
1994 British television series endings
BBC television sitcoms
British supernatural television shows
Television series about Jews and Judaism
English-language television shows
Television series about families
Television series about ghosts